Agononida longispinata is a species of squat lobster in the family Munididae. It is found off of southwestern Luzon and the east coast of Mindoro and in the Mindanao Sea.

References

Squat lobsters
Crustaceans described in 1988